Ludic, or Ludian, or Ludic Karelian ( or  ), is a Finnic language in the Uralic language family or a Karelian dialect. It is transitional between the Olonets Karelian language and the Veps language. It is spoken by 300 Karelians in the Republic of Karelia in Russia, near the southwestern shore of Lake Onega, including a few children.

Classification
In the Finnish research tradition, Ludic has been considered a transitional dialect area between Karelian and Veps, while in the Russian research tradition it is, on ethnographic grounds, normally considered a dialect of Karelian. A status as an independent language has been proposed in recent times. Ludic is characterised by a specific mixture of Karelian-like traits (such as the diphthongisation of the Proto-Finnic non-open long vowels: e.g. *pää > piä 'head', *soo > suo 'swamp', contrast Veps pä, so) and Veps-like traits (such as an almost complete loss of consonant gradation).

Dialects
Ludic comprises three main dialect groups:
 Northern (Lake) Ludic, at the northwestern shores of Lake Onega
 Central (River) Ludic, at settlements along river Shuya and near the city of Petrozavodsk
 Kuďäŕv (Forest) Ludic, in the Mikhaylovskoye rural locality
The strongest Karelian resemblance is found in Northern Ludic, while the Kuďäŕv dialect shares the most features with Veps.

Phrases 
 ken sina oled = who are you
 mi tämä on = what is this
 kudam teiš on onni = which one of you is Onni
 kuspiä sina astud = where do you live
 mikš sina nagrad = why are you laughing
 kudam čuas on = what time is it
 konz hyö tuldah kodih = when are they coming home
 häin lähtöu huomei = he/she leaves tomorrow

See also
Karelian language

Notes

Literature

External links

ISO 639 code sets -  SIL International
Lyydiläinen Seura (The Ludian Society)

Finnic languages
Languages of Russia
Karelian language
Republic of Karelia
Veps language